Bangladesh Police Medal (Bravery) Bengali: {বাংলাদেশ পুলিশ পদক (সাহসিকতা)}, is a police medal of Bangladesh. The medal is intended for the awarding the officers of Bangladesh Police and Rapid Action Battalion. Police medals are awarded every year in the annual Police Week Parade. They are awarded both for bravery and service.

References 

Law enforcement in Bangladesh
Orders, decorations, and medals of Bangladesh